In the United States, Obama–Trump voters, sometimes referred to as Trump Democrats or Obama Republicans, are people who voted for Democratic Party nominee Barack Obama in the 2008 or 2012 presidential elections (or both), but later voted for Republican Party nominee Donald Trump in 2016 or 2020 (or both). Data shows that in 2016, these voters comprised roughly 13% of Trump voters. In 2012, this segment of voters made up 9% of total Obama voters. Seven percent of 2012 Obama voters did not vote at all in 2016, and 3% voted for a third party candidate. While some analysts consider Obama–Trump voters to have been decisive in Trump's 2016 victory, others have disputed this conclusion.

According to research done by the Democracy Fund Voter Study Group, compared to other voters, Obama–Trump voters have progressive economic views and conservative social views. Though these voters supported Trump in the 2016 and 2020 elections, they are less supportive of Republicans as a whole, and show a desire to change the status quo.

Studies 
Various studies estimate the percentage of 2016 Trump voters, who had previously voted for Obama, at between 11 and 15 percent. The Cooperative Congressional Election Study (CCES) found that 11% of 2016 Trump voters had voted for Obama in 2012, with the American National Election Study putting the number at 13%, and the University of Virginia Center for Politics estimating 15%. Expressed in total number of voters, these percentages indicate that between 7 and 9 million 2016 Trump voters voted for Obama in 2012. According to a May 2017 McClatchy news report, an analysis by  Democratic political firm Global Strategy Group estimated that Obama–Trump voters accounted for more than two-thirds of Obama voters who did not vote for Hillary Clinton.

Significance 

Some analysts have argued that Obama–Trump voters had a disproportionately large impact on the 2016 election because they were concentrated in key swing states in the Midwest while others have said they were actually "Obama Republicans" rather than Democrats to begin with. 

Some have disputed both the quantity and the significance of Obama–Trump voters in deciding the outcome of the 2016 election. Dana Milbank argued in an August 2017 Washington Post column that the number of such voters was initially overstated and that most of them were Republicans who only defected from their party to vote for Obama, not Democrats who defected to support Trump. Nate Cohn countered Milbank's assessment by arguing that Milbank's focus on national data obscured the magnitude of Democratic defection in 2016 to support Trump. Cohn noted that when looking specifically at white Obama voters with no higher education than a high school diploma, Clinton won only 74% (based on data from the Democracy Fund Voter Study Group) or 78% (based on the Cooperative Congressional Election Study).

In a 2021 interview about their book Trump's Democrats, Stephanie Muravchik and Jon A. Shields noted that many Obama–Trump voters likewise voted for Trump in the 2020 election, in some counties in even larger numbers than in 2016. Muravchik and Shields assessed that these "flipped" Democrats would continue to be a key factor in future elections.

Voters' views 
Shortly before the 2016 election, The New York Times reported that Obama voters who planned to vote for Trump felt he embodied the "change" they had hoped for when they voted for Obama. Multiple focus groups of Obama–Trump voters convened by the Roosevelt Institute and Democracy Corps in early 2017 showed that in general these voters wanted to change the status quo and had skeptical views of Congressional Republicans and their proposals. The same focus groups also indicated that these voters hoped then-President Trump would help reduce health care costs for working-class Americans, and that they were anxious about some immigrant groups.

A multi-year survey completed by the Democracy Fund Voter Study Group found that Obama–Trump voters generally had liberal views on economic issues, but conservative views on social issues. In a 2017 editorial for New York Magazine, Eric Levitz noted that data from the CCES indicates 75% of Obama–Trump voters supported repealing and replacing the Affordable Care Act.

According to an article in Politico, a September 2017 Democracy Fund Voter Study Group poll found that 70% of Obama–Trump voters approved of the job Trump was doing as president. This figure was significantly lower than the 88% approval rating among all Trump voters. Similarly, the percent of voters who disapproved of Trump's performance in this poll was much higher among Obama–Trump voters (22%) than among Trump voters as a whole (9%).

In the 2020 U.S. presidential election, which saw record turnouts of both Republicans and Democrats, Trump received millions more votes than he had received in 2016, including an overall increase in votes from people of color, despite losing the election to Democrat Joe Biden. Likewise, Biden received more votes than did Hillary Clinton in 2016.

In a 2021 interview about their book Trump's Democrats, Stephanie Muravchik and Jon A. Shields assert that (in light of the even higher turnout for Trump in 2020 in many counties that had previously flipped from Obama to Trump) the views, geographical location, and votes, of Obama–Trump voters, will continue to be important in U.S. elections.

See also 
 List of Democrats who opposed the Hillary Clinton 2016 presidential campaign
 Reagan Democrat
 Sanders–Trump voters

References 

Trump voters
Donald Trump
Donald Trump 2016 presidential campaign
Hillary Clinton 2016 presidential campaign
Political terminology of the United States
Voting in the United States